(For a similar-sounding film from the same year by D. W. Griffith, see The White Rose)

The White Flower is a 1923 American silent romantic drama film written and directed by Julia Crawford Ivers and starring Betty Compson and Edmund Lowe. Ivers' son, James Van Trees, was the film's cinematographer. Set in Hawaii, the film was shot on location in Honolulu. The White Flower is now considered lost.

Cast
Betty Compson as Konia Markham
Edmund Lowe as Bob Rutherford
Edward Martindel as John Markham
Arline Pretty as Ethel Granville
Sylvia Ashton as Mrs. Gregory Bolton
Arthur Hoyt as Gregory Bolton
Leon Barry as David Panuahi
Lily Philips as Bernice Martin
Reginald Carter as Edward Graeme
Maui Kaito as Kahuna

See also
Hula (1927)

References

External links

Lantern slide (Wayback Machine)
southseascinema.com, a website devoted to island themed films & television

1923 films
1923 romantic drama films
American romantic drama films
American silent feature films
American black-and-white films
Famous Players-Lasky films
Films shot in Honolulu
Films set in Hawaii
Lost American films
Paramount Pictures films
1923 lost films
Lost romantic drama films
Films directed by Julia Crawford Ivers
1920s American films
Silent romantic drama films
Silent American drama films